Povarov (feminine: Povarova) is a Russian-language  occupational surname derived from the word povar, "cook". Notable people with the surname include:

L. S. Povarov, Soviet chemist, the namesake of the Povarov reaction
Kira Povarova, Soviet and Russian materials scientist

Russian-language surnames